Badminton competitions at the 2016 Pekan Olahraga Nasional were held between 19 September and 28 September at GOR Bima, Cirebon, West Java, Indonesia. A total of 87 athletes from 17 provinces participated. In this edition, athletes who can participate are limited to a maximum birth of 1991.

Qualification
A total of 87 athletes from 17 provinces participated.

Medalists

References

2016 Pekan Olahraga Nasional
2016 in badminton